Halsham is a village and civil parish in the East Riding of Yorkshire, England, in an area known as Holderness.

According to the 2011 UK census, Halsham parish had a population of 255, a decrease on the 2001 UK census figure of 260.

The parish church of All Saints was designated a Grade I listed building in 1966 and is now recorded in the National Heritage List for England, maintained by Historic England. To the east of the church is a Mausoleum of the Constable family which is designated as a Grade II* listed building.

HMS Halsham, a Ham class of inshore minesweeper, was named after the village.

In 1823 inhabitants in the village numbered 315. Occupations included sixteen farmers, three wheelwrights, a bricklayer, a grocer, a blacksmith, and the landlord of the Sun public house. A carrier operated between the village and Hull on Tuesdays. The village was described as consisting of "chiefly a number of respectable farm houses, scattered at irregular distances from each other." The mausoleum to the Constable family is described as of stone, with polished white marble facing, with, at its centre, a monument to Sir William Constable (Historic England credits it to Sir Edward; Pevsner to Sir William), built at a cost of £10,000. Sir John Constable of Kirkby Knowle in 1584 left 80/- (shillings) per year from his estate to be paid out in perpetuity: 20/- for the education of eight poor children with a further 24/- for their satchels and books; 32/- for eight poor men; and 4/- for two poor women. He provided for a hospital for the use of the poor men and women of the parish.

References

External links

Villages in the East Riding of Yorkshire
Holderness
Civil parishes in the East Riding of Yorkshire